Events in the year 1978 in Norway.

Incumbents
 Monarch – Olav V
 Prime Minister – Odvar Nordli (Labour Party)

Events
28 August – At Hopen, Svalbard, a Soviet Tupolev Tu-16 aircraft accidentally crashes at the sides of Werenskioldfjellet.
 7 September – Skateboarding is banned in Norway.

Popular culture

Sports
15 to 17 September – the 1978 World Orienteering Championships were held in Kongsberg
22 October – Lillestrøm wins the 1978 Norwegian Football Cup final by beating Brann 2–1.

Music

Film

Literature
Harald Sverdrup, poet and children's writer, is awarded the Dobloug Prize literature award.
Kjartan Fløgstad is awarded the Nordic Council Literature Prize, for Dalen Portland.

Notable births

3 January – Ronny Thorsen, vocalist
4 January – Martin Knudsen, footballer
4 January – Stian Ohr, footballer
10 January – Kristian Aadnevik, fashion designer
10 January – Thomas Finstad, footballer
10 January – Astrid Johannessen, footballer
17 January – Frode Kippe, footballer
17 January – Maria Tryti Vennerød, playwright
18 January – Thor Hushovd, cyclist
18 January – Terje Skjeldestad, footballer
21 January – Inge André Olsen, footballer
27 January – Kai Ove Stokkeland, footballer
29 January – Yngvar Håkonsen, footballer
30 January – Jan Thore Grefstad, singer and songwriter
1 February – Anders Hasselgård, footballer
9 February – Gro Marit Istad Kristiansen, biathlete
11 February – Inga Sætre, illustrator and comics writer.
12 February – Susanne Wigene, middle- and long-distance runner
14 February – Endre Hansen, footballer
17 February – Anders Nordberg, orienteering competitor
25 February – Kristin Frogner, actress, musician and sculptor
25 February – Amund Skiri, footballer
28 February – Audun Grønvold, freestyle skier.
1 March – Runar Normann, footballer
5 March – Kent Gudmundsen, politician.
8 March – Thor Anders Myhren, musician
9 March – Marianne Rokne, handballer
10 March – Terrie Miller, swimmer
13 March – Erlend Fuglum, politician
13 March – Gaute Heivoll, poet, novelist, playwright and short story writer
21 March – Arnstein Finstad, cross-country skier
21 March – Vegard Samdahl, handballer
25 March – Alexandra Koefoed, sailor
27 March – Marius Bakken, runner
27 March – Tom Stenvoll, footballer
1 April – Rune Berger, footballer
1 April – Tom Harald Hagen, footballer
5 April – Arild Stokkan-Grande, politician
5 April – Steinar Tenden, footballer
6 April – Stig Arild Råket, footballer
11 April – Martin Bartnes, ski mountaineer and cross-country skier
15 April – Jøran Kallmyr, politician.
17 April – Bjørn Dahl, footballer
17 April – Arild Sundgot, footballer
18 April – Ingrid Berntsen, freestyle skier
20 April – Kjetil Norland, footballer
23 April – Lorentz Aspen, musician
27 April – Knut Dørum Lillebakk, footballer
5 May – Ola Gjeilo, composer and pianist
6 May – Hilde Lindset, writer
12 May – Annette Bjelkevik, speed skater
17 May – Christian Berg, footballer
17 May – Tor Halvor Bjørnstad, cross-country skier, biathlete and winter triathlete
17 May – Mirjam Kristensen, novelist and non-fiction writer
28 May – Elin Lerum Boasson, environmentalist
12 June – Nikolai Astrup, politician
15 June – Hege Christin Vikebø, handballer
17 June – Mette Karlsvik, musician
19 June – Dagny Mellgren, footballer
24 June – Nikolai Eilertsen, bass guitarist
28 June – Truls Vasvik, politician.
9 July – Birgitte Sættem, handballer
20 July – Fritz Aanes, Greco-Roman wrestler
26 July – Silvia Moi, opera singer
27 July – Vibeke Johansen, swimmer 
28 July – Torbjørn Røe Isaksen, politician
2 August – Hege Bae Nyholt, politician.
3 August – Christer Ellefsen, footballer
4 August – Siri Nordby, footballer
4 August – Per-Åge Skrøder, ice hockey player
13 August – Geir Pollestad, politician
14 August – Petter Furuseth, footballer
17 August – Vibeke Stene, vocalist
22 August – Trond Viggo Toresen, footballer
26 August – Sveinung Fjeldstad, footballer
26 August – Knut Sirevåg, footballer
31 August – Morten Qvenild, jazz pianist
3 September – Terje Bakken, musician (d. 2004)
10 September – Kai Olav Ryen, footballer
11 September – Else-Marthe Sørlie Lybekk, handballer.
13 September – Peter Sunde, politician
14 September – Alexander Aas, footballer
16 September – Mads Hansen, ice hockey player
16 September – Ane Carmen Roggen, soprano singer
16 September – Ida Roggen, jazz singer
17 September – Martine Aurdal, journalist and newspaper editor
21 September – Jarl André Storbæk, footballer
25 September – Jan Egil Andresen, cross-country skier
26 September – Ingfrid Breie Nyhus, pianist
26 September – Christoffer Sundby, sailor
29 September – Kurt Nilsen, pop/country singer and winner of Idol (Norway season 1) and World Idol
3 October – Inger Bråtveit, novelist and children's writer
5 October – Steinar Nickelsen, jazz musician
10 October – Kenneth Dokken, footballer
12 October – Børge-Are Halvorsen, jazz musician
14 October – Lars Erik Bartnes, politician
14 October – Siril Helljesen, equestrian
15 October – Truls Wickholm, politician
17 October – Rolv Eriksrud, ski mountaineer and cross-country skier
20 October – Venke Knutson, singer
25 October – Camilla Indset Sorgjerd, cyclist
26 October – Tarjei Strøm, rock musician
27 October – Hugo Mikal Skår, rock musician
30 October – Tore Bruvoll, musician
3 November – Jonas Howden Sjøvaag, jazz drummer
5 November – Jørgen Rostrup, orienteering competitor, world champion
5 November – Marita Røstad, jazz musician
6 November – Tarjei Skarlund, beach volleyball player
7 November – Line Østvold, snowboarder (d. 2004)
9 November – Even Ormestad, bass guitarist
10 November – Alexander Refsum Jensenius, researcher and musician
12 November – Lars Ivar Moldskred, footballer
13 November – Marit Velle Kile, actress
16 November – Gyda Ellefsplass Olssen, sport shooter
25 November – Alexander Wefald, sprint canoer
28 November – Siri Hall Arnøy, politician
28 November – Mette Karlsvik, journalist
28 November – Petar Rnkovic, footballer
1 December – Trygve Slagsvold Vedum, politician
4 December – Lars Bystøl, ski jumper
7 December – Kristofer Hivju, film actor, producer, and writer
12 December – Lage Lund, jazz musician
13 December – Kristin Lie, footballer
25 December – Camilla Holth, curler
30 December – Julie Dahle Aagård, jazz musician

Full date missing
Bjørnar Andersen, dog musher
Fredrik K.B., sculptor
Trond Frønes, musician
Ray Kay, photographer

Notable deaths

16 January – Otto Dahl, politician (b.1914)
16 January – Svein Helling, sport shooter (b. 1910)
18 January – John Lyng, barrister and politician (b. 1905).
21 January – Olav Sundal, gymnast and Olympic silver medallist (b.1899).
27 January – Ernst Gervin, magazine editor (b. 1908)
27 January – Alf Konningen, alpine skier (b.1901)
14 February – Anders Hove, politician (b.1885)
19 February – Olaf Ditlev-Simonsen, sailor and Olympic silver medallist, footballer, sports administrator and businessman (b. 1897).
21 February – Raoul Heide, fencer (b. 1888).
3 March – Georg Morgenstierne, linguist (b. 1892)
13 March – Kaare Bache, triple jumper (b. 1888).
13 March – Ottar Wicklund, actor (b. 1911)
19 March – Reidar Lund, cinematographer (b. 1897)
24 March – Just Lippe, journalist and politician (b. 1904)
27 March – Sverre Farstad, speed skater and Olympic gold medallist (b.1920)
29 March – Ragna Thiis Stang, historian and museum administrator (b. 1909).
1 April – Olaf Nygaard, cyclist (b. 1894)
18 April – Alex Brinchmann, children's physician and songwriter, novelist, playwright and crime writer (b. 1888).
25 April – Arne Rustadstuen, Nordic skier, Olympic bronze medallist and World Champion (b.1905)
4 May – Kolbjørn Fjeld, librarian and publisher (born 1901).
8 May – Klara Amalie Skoglund, politician (b.1891)
9 May – Halvor Bunkholt, politician (b.1903)
20 May – Bjarne Brustad, composer and violinist (b. 1895).
4 June – Ingolf Rogde, actor (b. 1911)
9 June – Odd Erling Melsom, military officer and newspaper editor (b. 1900)
17 June – Niels Onstad, ship owner and art collector (b. 1909)
18 June – Harald Normann, military officer and non-fiction writer (b. 1893).
3 July – Syvert Tobiassen Messel, politician (b.1897)
3 July – Sigrid Stray, barrister (b. 1893)
27 July – Henrik Friis Robberstad, politician (b.1901)
31 July – Ørnulf Egge, politician and resistance member (b. 1910)
3 August – Einar Wilhelms, footballer (b. 1895).
15 August – Viggo Brun, mathematician (b.1885)
15 August – Hartvig Kiran, poet and radio personality (b. 1911).
16 August – Henry Olsen, track and field athlete (b.1887)
30 August – Vebjørn Tandberg, businessperson and industrialist (b.1904)
6 September – Ketil Askildt, discus thrower (b. 1900)
8 September – Borghild Hammerich, philanthropist (b. 1901).
30 September – Eiliv Skard, classical philologist (b. 1898).
2 October – Sjur Johnsen, wrestler (b. 1891).
15 October – Rolf Stenersen, track and field athlete, businessman, art collector, non-fiction writer, essayist, novelist, playwright and biographer (b. 1899).
17 October – Robert Giertsen, sailor (b. 1894)
17 October – Sigurd Evensmo, author and journalist (b.1912).
26 October – Rolf Schjerven, politician (b.1918)
1 November – Arne Paasche Aasen, politician, journalist and poet (b. 1901)
13 November – Liv Tomter, politician (b.1901)
4 December – Tancred Ibsen, officer, pilot, film director and screenwriter (b.1893)
4 December – Sverre Nordby, footballer (b. 1910)
6 December – Hans Heiberg, journalist, literary critic, theatre critic, essayist, novelist, playwright, translator and theatre director (b. 1904).
10 December – Kirsten Sinding-Larsen, architect (b. 1898)
31 December – Arne Gjedrem, politician (b.1890)

Full date missing
Aslak Brekke, folksinger (b.1901)
Reidar Kjellberg, art historian (b.1904)
Kåre Kvisli, jurist and civil servant (b. 1903)
Aagot Nissen, actress (b. 1882)
Marius Nygaard, judge (b. 1902)
Margrete Aamot Øverland, resistance member (b.1913)
Erik T. Poulsson, judge (b. 1897)
Lita Prahl, actress and costume designer (b. 1905)
Carl Søyland, newspaper editor (b.1894)

See also

References

External links